Makiyamaia coreanica is a species of sea snail, a marine gastropod mollusk in the family Clavatulidae.

Description
The size of an adult shell varies between 25 mm and 50.9 mm. The whorls are angular and tuberculated in the middle. These tubercles develop from more or less indistinct oblique folds or ribs, everywhere closely encircled by striae. The color of the shell is light yellowish brown, the tubercles lighter.

Distribution
This marine species occurs off Korea, Japan and Taiwan; also reported from the China seas.
.

References

 Powell, A.W.B. (1969). The Family Turridae in the Indo-Pacific. Part. 2. The subfamily Turriculinae. . Indo-Pacific Mollusca. 2 : 215–415, pls 188–324 p. 308

External links
 
  BAOQUAN LI & XINZHENG LI, Report on the two subfamilies Clavatulinae and Cochlespirinae (Mollusca: Neogastropoda: Turridae) from the China seas; Zootaxa 1771: 31–42 (2008) 

coreanica
Gastropods described in 1850